Sulaiman Al-Rajhi University (officially abbreviated as SRC) is a private, non-profit, research university, comprising three graduate colleges: Medicine, Nursing and Applied Medical Sciences as well as a state-of-the-art University Hospital. The university were founded by the Sulaiman Bin Abdul Aziz Al Rajhi Charitable Foundation and is located in Al Bukayriyah, Saudi Arabia.

Aim and vision
Sulaiman Al Rajhi University aims are to produce highly trained and specialized cadres of manpower as required for development. The project of establishing the Medical, Nursing and Applied Medical Sciences Colleges with a University Hospital is envisaged to further improve the health sciences education, patient care and biomedical research to match international standards. The rationale behind establishing the university is due to a calculated estimate demand for higher education in the kingdom.

Campus
The university's main campus is near the Madinah-Riyadh Highway
SRC's campus is specifically located beside the highway connecting Riyadh and Madinah and sits approximately 370 km from the capital city of Riyadh. When completed it will cover an area of 10,100 hectares.

Governance
As of January 2008, Professor Dr. Saleh Bin Abdullah Al Damegh was named the chief supervisor and founding dean of Sulaiman Al Rajhi University. In his concluding statement Sheikh Al Rajhi indicated that the general supervision of the university has been commissioned to Prof. Dr. Saleh Bin Abdullah Al Damegh, for his long academic background and wide experience in the field of medicine.

Partnerships

University of Maastricht & UMC+

In the pursuit of creating the "Islands of Excellence," Sulaiman Al Rajhi University signed a memorandum of understanding under the patronage of H.E. Dr. Khalid bin Mohammad Al Angary, the Saudi Minister of Higher Education, H.E. Ms. Maria Josephina Arnoldina, Netherlands Minister of Economic Affairs, and in the presence of Dr. Mohammed Al Ohali, the ministry's deputy for education.

KPMG
The agreement between KPMG and SRC forms the basis of an extensive and intensive effort by the University and KPMG to build  world-class organizational and operational capacity of SRC.  The university seeks to primarily focus on delivering medical and health science education and will include a university hospital to serve the local community as well as the doctors-to-be.

Teaching

The university are primarily health and research centered and, as such, English is the medium of instruction at SRC. The medical education of SRC is based upon the medical curriculum of Maastricht University
therefore students enrolled at Sulaiman Al Rajhi University will be taught using the education methodology of problem-based learning (PBL). In line with Maastricht's PBL philosophy, SRC believes that the students should be personally responsible for their academic education.

Medical departments
The SRC Medical College will begin its first ever problem-based learning (PBL) medical program in late September 2010, in accordance to Maastricht University new academic year of 2010-2011. The medical college would comprise the following departments:
 Department of Physiology
 Department of Biochemistry
 Department of Anatomy
 Department of Pathology
 Department of Microbiology & Clinical Parasitology
 Department of Pharmacology & Clinical Therapeutics
 Department of Forensic Medicine/Medical Jurisprudence
 Department of Family & Community Medicine
 Department of Internal Medicine (including Psychiatry, Dermatology, Neurology, Cardiology & Radiology)
 Department of Surgery (including Orthopedics, ENT, Ophthalmology & Anesthesiology)
 Department of Obstetrics & Gynecology
 Department of Pediatrics
 Department of Medical Laboratory Science

Additional images

Notes

External links
 Official website of Sulaiman Al Rajhi Colleges.
Maastricht medical education in Saudi Arabia.
 Maastricht University conducts first PBL Winter Course 2010.

2009 establishments in Saudi Arabia
Educational institutions established in 2009
Universities and colleges in Saudi Arabia